Events from the year 1663 in China. Also known as 壬寅 (Water Tiger) 4359 or 4299 to 卯年 (Water Rabbit) 4360 or 4300 in the Earthly Branches calendar.

Incumbents 
 Kangxi Emperor (2nd year)
 Regents — Sonin, Ebilun, Suksaha, and Oboi

Viceroys
 Viceroy of Zhili — Miao Cheng
 Viceroy of Min-Zhe — Zhao Tingchen
 Viceroy of Huguang — Zhang Changgeng
 Viceroy of Shaanxi — Bai Rumei
 Viceroy of Guangdong — Li Qifeng
 Viceroy of Yun-Gui — Zhao Tingchen 
 Viceroy of Guizhou — Tong Yannian, Yang Maoxun
 Viceroy of Yunnan — Bian Sanyuan
 Viceroy of Sichuan — Li Guoying
 Viceroy of Jiangnan —  Lang Tingzuo

Events 
 Kinmen in Fujian is captured by Qing dynasty forces from Ming dynasty loyalists.
 Zhuang Tinglong case — a criminal case concerning an unauthorised history of the Ming dynasty and unflattering depiction of the Qing dynasty concludes. Thousands of people who were involved or implicated in the case were rounded up at a military camp in Hangzhou, where they were sentenced. Over 70 people were condemned to death
 Dafo Temple, a Buddhist temple in Guangzhou is rebuilt and expanded by Shang Kexi. The building has been devastated by years of war and neglect
Kaifeng Jews build a stele and an eight Hall of Scriptures
Koxinga Ancestral Shrine built by Zheng Jing in modern-day Tainan, Taiwan to worship his father Koxinga
Geng Jimao and  lead a joint Qing-Dutch attack on Zheng family forces in Kinmen and Xiamen
The lifting of an especially strict haijin policy implemented by the Qing in 1661, where the entire coastal population of Fujian, and parts of Guangdong and Zhejiang provinces is moved twenty miles inland. Thousands die in the ordeal.
 Sino-Russian border conflicts

Births
 Wu Shifan (1663-1681), son of Wu Sangui and ruler of Zhou

Deaths 
 March 20 — Empress Xiaokangzhang, (孝康章皇后; 1638 – 1663) a consort of the Shunzhi Emperor
 Hong Ren (Chinese: 弘仁; 1610–1663) an early Qing painter and a member of the Anhui (or Xin'an) school of painting

References

 

 
China